Kyneton Boroughs was an electoral district of the Legislative Assembly in the Australian state of Victoria from 1856 to 1889. It included the towns of Kyneton, Malmsbury, Taradale, Carlsruhe and Woodend.
It was superseded in 1889 by the Electoral district of Kyneton.

The district of Kyneton Boroughs was one of the initial districts of the first Victorian Legislative Assembly, 1856.

Members for Kyneton Boroughs

References

Former electoral districts of Victoria (Australia)
1856 establishments in Australia
1889 disestablishments in Australia